O Natal do Menino Imperador (The Little Emperor's Christmas) is a 2008 Portuguese language television film for children from Brazil, by Rede Globo.

It was shortlisted for an International Emmy in the children and young people category in 2009, but the award was won by Dustbin Baby.

Cast:

Adriano Garib

Aracy Balabanian – D. Mariana

Carolyna Aguiar - Princesa Isabel

Ettore Zuim

Gilles Gwizdek

Gláucio Gomes

Guilherme Weber – Marquês de Itanhaém

Guillermo Hundadze – Pedro II (child)

Iléa Ferraz

João Camargo Conde de Barbacena

João Ramos – Dito

Júlio Levy

Luciano Pullig

Luís Carlos Vasconcelos – Zampano

Marcelo Várzea Conde D’Eu

Oscar Ortman

Rafael Miguel Antônio

Reynaldo Gianecchini – D. Pedro I

Sérgio Britto – D. Pedro II

References

External links
O Natal do Menino Imperador at IMDb
Trailer

2000s Portuguese-language films
2008 television films
2008 films
Brazilian television films
Brazilian Christmas films
Christmas television films